Roberto Plano (born 1 August 1978 in Varese) is an Italian pianist, winner of the Cleveland International Piano Competition (2001) and laureate at numerous international competitions such as the Sendai International Music Competition, the Honens International Piano Competition, Twelfth Van Cliburn International Piano Competition, The American Prize, Valencia International Piano Competition Prize Iturbi and the Concours Géza Anda.

Discography 
 Inspiration, Roberto Plano & Paolo Paliaga (2017, Da Vinci Classics)
 Franz Liszt, Harmonies poétiques et religieuses (28-30 September 2015, 2CD Decca 481 2479) 
 Giovanni Sgambati, Quintets with piano and string quartets - Noferini Quartet (26-28 October 2013, Brilliant Classics 94813) 
 Bedřich Smetana, Feuilles d'album and other pieces for piano (1-3 March 2013, Brilliant Classics 94788) 
 Andrea Luchesi, Concertos pour piano - Roberto Plano, piano; Orchestre Ferruccio Busoni, dir. Massimo Belli, (4-5 February 2013, Concerto Classics) 
 Andrea Luchesi, 3 Sonatas for piano and 2 Rondos (2012, Concerto Classics) 
 Andrea Luchesi, 6 Sonatas for piano, Op. 1 (21-22 November 2012, Amadeus July 2013) 
 Franz Liszt, Tre sonetti del Petrarca, due ballate, due leggende (2003, Azica Records ACD71222) 
 Frédéric Chopin, Nocturnes Op. 27; Franz Liszt, Polonaise n°2, Sposalizio, Sonetto del Petrarca n°104, Parafrasi sul Rigoletto; Alexander Scriabin, Sonata-Fantasia n°2 Op. 19 (Sipario Dischi CG109C)

References

External links 
 Official website
 Anthony Tommasini, « A Prize Winner Ventures A Bit Outside the Mold » (17 November 2001) in The New York Times.
 Roberto Plano on Discogs
 Alexander Skrjabin's "Improvviso Op.14 No.2" (YouTube)

1978 births
Living people
Musicians from Varese
Italian classical pianists
Male classical pianists
Italian male pianists
21st-century pianists
21st-century classical pianists
21st-century Italian male musicians